The 1949–50 Chicago Black Hawks season was the team's 24th season in the National Hockey League. The Black Hawks finished in sixth, out of the playoffs.

Off-season
In goal, the Black Hawks acquired long-time Boston Bruins goaltender Frank Brimsek. Brimsek would play in all 70 games for the Hawks, winning 22 of them, earning five shutouts along the way, and posting a 3.49 GAA.

Regular season
The Black Hawks had finished in fifth place in 1948–49, failing to qualify for the playoffs for the third year in a row. Prior to the season, the NHL announced that they would be adding ten games to the regular season schedule, raising it from 60 games to 70.  Despite the extra games added, the Black Hawks would only win one more game than the previous season, and finish in last place in the NHL with 54 points, 13 behind the New York Rangers for the final playoff spot, missing the playoffs for the fourth straight season.

Offensively, the Hawks scoring was spread out, as 22-year-old Metro Prystai led the Hawks with 29 goals, Doug Bentley had a team high 33 assists, and Roy Conacher had a club-best 56 points.  Bill Gadsby would be a force on the blueline, leading the way with 10 goals and 35 points, and having a team high 138 penalty minutes. The Hawks scored 203 goals, second highest total in the league, but would allow a league high 244 goals.

Season standings

Record vs. opponents

Schedule and results

Regular season

Player statistics

Scoring leaders

Goaltending

References
SHRP Sports
The Internet Hockey Database
National Hockey League Guide & Record Book 2007

Notes

Chicago Blackhawks seasons
Chicago
Chicago